Banquet in Silence is a 1930s painting  by Marsden Hartley. It is in the collection of the Metropolitan Museum of Art.

Early history and creation 
The painting was created in 1935–36 and is composed of oil paint on canvas board.

Later history and display 
The artwork was given by Marsden Hartley to Georgia O'Keeffe who then donated it to the Metropolitan Museum of Art.

Description
The work depicts a banquet plate with fish and unidentified fruit on it.

References 

Created via preloaddraft
Paintings in the collection of the Metropolitan Museum of Art